This is a list of fossiliferous stratigraphic units in Eritrea.



See also 
 Lists of fossiliferous stratigraphic units in Africa
 List of fossiliferous stratigraphic units in Ethiopia
 List of fossiliferous stratigraphic units in Sudan
 Geology of Eritrea

References

Further reading 
 E. Abbate, A. Albianelli A. Azzaroli, M. Benvenuti, B. Tesfamariam, P. Bruni, N. Cipriani, et al. 1998. A one-million-year-old Homo cranium from the Danakil (Afar) Depression of Eritrea. Nature 393:458-460
 R. Jordan. 1971. Megafossilien des Jura aus dem Antalo-Kalk von Nord-Äthiopien [Jurassic megafossils from the Antalo Limestone of northern Ethiopia]. Beihefte zum Geologischen Jahrbuch 116:141-171
 J. Shoshani, R. C. Walter, M. Abraha, S. Berhe, P. Tassy, W. J. Sanders, G. H. Marchant, Y. Libsekal, T. Ghirmai and D. Zinner. 2006. A proboscidean from the late Oligocene of Eritrea, a ‘‘missing link’’ between early Elephantiformes and Elephantimorpha, and biogeographic implications. Proceedings of the National Academy of Sciences 103(46):17296-17301

Eritrea
 
Geologic formations of Eritrea
Eritrea geography-related lists
Fossil